Oneida Limited is an American manufacturer and seller of tableware and cutlery. Oneida is one of the world’s largest designers and sellers of stainless steel and silverplated cutlery and tableware for the consumer and foodservice industries. It is also the largest supplier of dinnerware to the foodservice industry in North America. The company operates in the United States, Canada, Latin America, Europe, and Asia, marketing and distributing tabletop products, which include flatware, dinnerware, crystal stemware, glassware and kitchen tools and gadgets.  The factory in upstate NY was sold to Liberty Tabletop, who is the sole manufacturer of US made flatware. The company originated in the late-nineteenth century in Oneida, New York.

History

Origins
The company arose out of the Oneida Community, which was established in Oneida, New York, in 1848. The Oneida Association (later Oneida Community) was founded by a small group of Christian Perfectionists led by John Humphrey Noyes, Jonathan Burt, George W. Cragin, Harriet A.Noyes, George W. Noyes, John L. Skinner and a few others. In 1880, after more than 30 years operating as a commune, the Oneida Community voted to transfer much of the common property to a joint-stock company to be known as Oneida Community Ltd. effective January 1, 1881.

Oneida Community Ltd. was one of the earliest joint-stock companies in the United States. Its founders' religious philosophy helped inform the early development of the company, in which members of the former Oneida Community became shareholders in the company. Its progressive nature also allowed for a woman, Harriet Joselyn, to sit on the board of directors — a departure from the norm for the time.

Oneida Community started production of silver-plated flatware and hollow-ware in 1899 using the "Community Plate" mark. Oneida Community purchased the Wm A. Rogers and 1881 Rogers companies in 1929 and started producing a somewhat lower-quality line of products using those companies’ marks. In 1935, Oneida Community changed its name to Oneida Ltd.

Post-war growth
Oneida Limited successfully adapted to the difficult economic conditions of the First World War and Second World War. Throughout both of these world economic upheavals, Oneida adapted its manufacturing capabilities. During the First World War, it produced ammunition clips, lead-plated gas shells, combat knives, and surgical instruments; during World War II, the company added army trucks, aircraft survival kits, and even jet engine parts to its manufacturing repertoire.

The company then managed an innovative transition to the manufacture of stainless steel flatware in 1961, which eventually dwarfed its production of silver-plated flatware. In 1971, Oneida purchased the Camden Wire Co., Inc., a major manufacturer of industrial wire products.

By the 1980s, Oneida made at least half of all flatware purchased in the United States. In 1983, the company acquired Rena-Ware, a Bellevue-based kitchenware manufacturer with a majority international operations. Oneida sold Rena-ware three years later. In 1984, it acquired D.J. Tableware, a flatware and china manufacturer that targeted the foodservice industry.

Modern era
At the end of the 1990s, the company encountered tough economic times, however it still tried to hold on to its mantle as the last remaining U.S.-based manufacturer of flatware, knives, forks, and spoons. The events surrounding 9/11 negatively affected the hospitality and consumer tableware markets, and in November 2003, Oneida sold its 100-year-old Buffalo China plant and four overseas factories in Mexico, China, and Italy. In February 2004, it sold off more assets to BC Acquisition Co. LLC for $5.5 million. Eventually, the manufacturing facilities in Sherrill, New York were sold to Sherrill Manufacturing on March 22, 2005.

In 1996, Oneida Limited acquired THC Systems, Inc., including its team of professionals, which operated under the name Rego China.

Oneida Limited transitioned from its manufacturing history and focused on design and marketing of its products that are globally sourced. Sales, marketing, advertising, procurement, customer service, legal and operational support is also still based in Oneida, New York. The company was taken private in 2006. Oneida no longer operates manufacturing in the United States.

Partly as a consequence of the economic blowback from 9/11, Oneida Limited's sales fell more than $157 million. In 2006, the company filed for Chapter 11 bankruptcy. After stabilizing financially and reducing its debt load, the company was purchased by a group of hedge funds led by Monarch Alternative Capital.

Oneida announced at the beginning of 2009 they were transitioning away from company-owned outlet stores due to poor financial results but retaining the original outlet store in Sherrill, New York. In September 2010, Oneida launched a new website, Oneida.com.

In November 2011, Oneida Limited was acquired by Monomoy Capital Partners, a mid-sized New York City equity fund. In 2012 Monomoy merged Oneida with Anchor Hocking and created EveryWare Global. In January 2014, EveryWare Global announced its plans to close its regional office and the Oneida outlet store, both in Sherrill, NY, with the process starting in April. 
The original Oneida outlet store in Sherrill, New York, was closed April 26, 2014. EveryWare Global filed for bankruptcy in 2015. EveryWare Global was renamed The Oneida Group in 2017.

Operations

Manufacturing
Oneida has had a variety of manufacturing facilities and capabilities throughout its existence. In addition to tableware, the company started out by manufacturing silk, traps, and chains. It gradually ceased these enterprises as they became less profitable for the company. In 1916, Oneida opened its first international factory in Niagara Falls, Ontario.

During World War II, Oneida purchased a factory in Canastota, New York, to manufacture army trucks, aircraft survival kits, and jet engine parts.

Throughout the 1960s and 70s, Oneida's workforce grew from 2,000 to 3,000 workers, and it transitioned into manufacturing stainless steel flatware. Starting in 1977, and continuing throughout the 80s and 90s, Oneida acquired orthogonal manufacturing companies making such things as wire, flatware, and china. To compete with international manufacturing, Oneida implemented high-volume manufacturing lines in its factories. It also opened new factories throughout the world: a dinnerware factory in Juarez, Mexico; flatware factory in Toluca, Mexico; holloware factory in Shanghai, China; holloware factory in Vercelli, Italy. In 2004, it closed those factories.

Since its acquisition by Monomoy Capital Partners, Oneida has manufactured its products across North America, South America, Asia, and Europe by means of 50 manufacturing contracts.

Advertising
Starting in 1899, Coles Phillips illustrated dozens of ads for the company, which was then known as Oneida Community. Maxfield Parrish, John Whitcomb also illustrated advertisements for the Oneida's products

Oneida also focused on print advertisements in home, fashion, bridal, and epicurean publications. It was also one of the first to employ celebrity spokespeople such as Bob Hope. Oneida inaugurated the practice by employing Irene Castle to promote its wares.
	
During the 1960s, Deutsch Inc. worked on Oneida's advertising. More recently, Oneida's advertising campaigns have won several Clio Awards.

Brands
Oneida Limited serves various customer segments by selling different brands of banquetware, flatware, glassware, and tableware. Its foodservice industry brands are Schonwald, Sant'Andrea, Oneida, and Buffalo. Its consumer products include the Oneida, Westminster and Stanley Rogers brands.

Schonwald
Oneida Limited is the exclusive American marketer and distributor of Schonwald foodservice dinnerware. The line is known for its trendsetting designs, advanced technology, and high quality. Schonwald is the company's 5-star luxury brand of foodservice dinnerware.

Sant'Andrea
Oneida Limited established the European-based Sant'Andrea brand in 1990. The line focuses on premium stainless steel or traditional silverplate flatware. Oneida, through its Italian subsidiary, Sant'Andrea, S.r.l., acquired Table Top Engineering & Design, S.r.l. in 1998. TTE&D had been the primary manufacturer of its Sant'Andrea line of fine foodservice dinnerware.

Oneida

Oneida Limited's main line has been available since the company's very beginning. The Oneida line is broken up into three sub-lines: Oneida Flatware, Oneida Holloware, and Oneida Dinnerware. The Oneida line of flatware and dinnerware is used by fine dining establishments, family restaurants, and hotels.

Buffalo
In 1983, Oneida Limited purchased Buffalo China, Inc., at the time one of the country's largest makers of commercial chinaware. After Oneida's 2004 series of factory closings and sales, Buffalo China ceased manufacturing, but Oneida retained the Buffalo China trademark and logos; it also retained the Buffalo China warehouse in Buffalo, New York. The Buffalo Collection is Oneida's casual line of dinnerware, focusing on durability, practicality, and detail.

References

External links
 Oneida website
 Oneida Foodservice
 Oneida Community Mansion House
 Sherrill website

Companies based in Oneida County, New York
Companies that filed for Chapter 11 bankruptcy in 2006
Companies that filed for Chapter 11 bankruptcy in 2015
Oneida, New York
Design companies established in 1880
Privately held companies based in New York (state)
Manufacturing companies of the United States
1880 establishments in New York (state)
Manufacturing companies established in 1880